1938 Lausanna, provisional designation , is a stony Florian asteroid from the inner regions of the asteroid belt, approximately 8 kilometers in diameter. It was discovered on 19 April 1974, by Swiss astronomer Paul Wild at Zimmerwald Observatory near Bern, Switzerland. It is named for the city of Lausanne.

Orbit and classification 

Lausanna is a S-type asteroid and member of the Flora family, one of the largest collisional populations of stony asteroids in the main-belt. It orbits the Sun in the inner main-belt at a distance of 1.9–2.6 AU once every 3 years and 4 months (1,222 days). Its orbit has an eccentricity of 0.16 and an inclination of 3° with respect to the ecliptic.

Physical characteristics

Rotation period 

In March 2014, two rotational lightcurves of Lausanna were obtained from photometric observations by American astronomer Brian Skiff and by Johan Warell at Lindby Observatory in Sweden. Lightcurve analysis gave an identical rotation period of 2.748 hours with a brightness amplitude of 0.13 and 0.12 magnitude, respectively. The short period is near the threshold of 2.2 hours for fast rotating asteroids.

Diameter and albedo 

According to the space-based survey carried out by NASA's Wide-field Infrared Survey Explorer with its subsequent NEOWISE mission, Lausanna measures 7.64 and 8.21 kilometers in diameter, and its surface has an albedo of 0.166 and 0.192, respectively. The Collaborative Asteroid Lightcurve Link assumes an albedo of 0.24 – derived from 8 Flora, the largest member and namesake of its family – and calculates a diameter of 7.82 kilometers based on an absolute magnitude of 12.7.

Naming 

This minor planet was named for the Swiss city of Lausanne, located in the French-speaking part of the country. The discoverer Paul Wild, known for his unconventional minor-planet namings, discovered three more asteroids during winter of 1973/74. He named these 1935 Lucerna, 1936 Lugano and 1937 Locarno, after the Swiss cities Lucerne, Lugano and Locarno, respectively, hence composing an alliterated quartet of sequentially numbered, thematically named minor planets. The official  was published by the Minor Planet Center on 1 April 1978.

Notes

References

External links 
 Asteroid Lightcurve Database (LCDB), query form (info )
 Dictionary of Minor Planet Names, Google books
 Asteroids and comets rotation curves, CdR – Observatoire de Genève, Raoul Behrend
 Discovery Circumstances: Numbered Minor Planets (1)-(5000) – Minor Planet Center
 
 

001938
Discoveries by Paul Wild (Swiss astronomer)
Named minor planets
001938
19740419